In geometry, the equal parallelians point   (also called congruent parallelians point) is a special point associated with a plane triangle. It is a triangle center and it is denoted by X(192) in Clark Kimberling's Encyclopedia of Triangle Centers. There is a reference to this point in one of Peter Yff's notebooks, written in 1961.

Definition

The equal parallelians point of triangle ABC is  a point P in the plane of triangle ABC such that the three segments through P parallel to the sidelines of ABC and having endpoints on these sidelines have equal lengths.

Trilinear coordinates
The trilinear coordinates of the equal parallelians point of triangle ABC are
( bc ( ca + ab – bc ) : ca ( ab + bc – ca ) : ab ( bc + ca – ab ) )

Construction for the equal parallelians point

Let A'B'C'  be the anticomplementary triangle of triangle ABC. Let the internal bisectors of the angles at the vertices A, B, C of triangle ABC meet the opposite sidelines at A'', B'', C'' respectively. Then the lines A'A'', B'B'' and C'C'' concur at the equal parallelians point of triangle ABC.

See also
Congruent isoscelizers point

References

Triangle centers